Integer function may refer to:
 Integer-valued function, an integer function
 Floor function, sometimes referred as the integer function, 
 Arithmetic function, a term for some functions of an integer variable

See also 
 Integer
 Function (mathematics)
 Integer (computer science)